Zabrus theveneti is a species of ground beetle in the Iberozabrus subgenus that is endemic to Spain (Andalusia).

References

Beetles described in 1874
Beetles of Europe
Endemic fauna of Spain
Zabrus